Tom or Thomas Dougherty may refer to:

 Tom Dougherty (baseball) (1881–1953), American baseball pitcher
 Tom Dougherty (union official) (1902–1972), Australian trade union official and politician
 J. Thomas Dougherty (born 1951), American diplomat
 Thomas M. Dougherty (1910–1996), American politician

See also
 Thomas Daugherty, member of The Elms (band)
 Tom Daugherty (born 1975), American ten-pin bowler
 Tom Docherty (1924–2020), English footballer
 Tommy Docherty (1928–2020), Scottish football player and manager